Elysius barnesi is a moth of the family Erebidae. It was described by William Schaus in 1904. It is found on Cuba.

References

barnesi
Moths described in 1904
Moths of the Caribbean
Endemic fauna of Cuba